Andsu Lakes Landscape Conservation Area is a nature park situated in Võru County, Estonia.

The protected area was designated in 1962 to protect Andsu lakes and theirs surrounding areas. In 2019, the protected area was redesigned to the landscape conservation area.

References

Nature reserves in Estonia
Geography of Võru County